Untold or The Untold may refer to:

Film and TV
The Untold, a 2002 American horror film 
Untold (Netflix), a sports documentary film series 
 Untold (TV series), an American news program

Music
Untold (festival), in Romania
Untold (musician), British producer
Untold (album), a 2003 album by Pete Francis
"Untold", a song by Matthew West from Live Forever (Matthew West album)
The Untold, a 2013 album by Atrium Carceri

Other uses 
 Untold (horse), a racehorse